Usher may refer to:

Several jobs which originally involved directing people and ensuring people are in the correct place:
 Usher (occupation)
 Church usher
 Wedding usher, one of the male attendants to the groom in a wedding ceremony
 Field usher, a military rank
 Usher of Justice, a judicial official in some countries
 Usher of the Black Rod, a parliamentary official in the UK, Australia, Canada and New Zealand
 Gentleman Usher, a category of royal official in the United Kingdom
 White House Chief Usher
 Usher (Switzerland), a largely ceremonial function in Swiss federal, cantonal, and local governments

People 
 Usher (musician)  (born 1978), American R&B recording artist, performer, and actor
 Usher (album), a 1994 debut album by Usher
 Usher Komugisha, Ugandan sports journalist and commentator
 Usher (surname), a list of people

Places 
 Usher, Western Australia
 Mount Usher, Antarctica
 Usher Glacier, South Shetland Islands
 Usher Hall, Edinburgh, Scotland
 Ushers, New York, a hamlet in Saratoga County, New York

Media

Film 
 Usher (2002 film), a short film directed by Curtis Harrington
 Usher (2004 film), a film based on the short story by Poe

Other uses in media 
 The family name in the Edgar Allan Poe short story "The Fall of the House of Usher"
 The Fall of the House of Usher (disambiguation), adaptations of Poe's work

Other uses 
 Gentleman Usher of an order of knights in the United Kingdom
 Usher 1C, a human gene
 Usher syndrome, a genetic disorder
 Ushers of Trowbridge, a former English brewery
 Usher baronets, a title in the Baronetage of the United Kingdom
 Usher (fragrance)
 Usher (software), an enterprise security platform

See also
 Ussher
 USHR (disambiguation)